The McFadyen–Stevens reaction is a chemical reaction best described as a base-catalyzed thermal decomposition of acylsulfonylhydrazides to aldehydes.

Dudman et al. have developed an alternative hydrazide reagent.

Reaction mechanism

The mechanism of the McFadyen–Stevens reaction is still under investigation.  Two groups have independently proposed a heterolytic fragmentation mechanism.  The mechanism involves the deprotonation of the acyl sulfonamide followed by a 1,2-hydride migration to give the alkoxide (3).  The collapse of the alkoxide results in the fragmentation producing the desired aldehyde (4), nitrogen gas, and an aryl sulfinate ion (5).

Martin et al. have proposed a different mechanism involving an acyl nitrene.

See also
 Hydrazide

References
  
  
  
  
  
  

Organic redox reactions
Rearrangement reactions
Name reactions